Nihim D. Shira is an Indian politician and member of the National People's Party. Shira is a second term member of the Meghalaya Legislative Assembly in 2014 from the  Songsak constituency in East Garo Hills.

References 

People from East Garo Hills district
National People's Party (India) politicians
Nationalist Congress Party politicians from Meghalaya
Living people
Meghalaya politicians
21st-century Indian politicians
Year of birth missing (living people)
Garo people
Manipur MLAs 2007–2012
Manipur MLAs 2012–2017